Henry Szymanski (July 4, 1898 – November 6, 1959) was an American wrestler. He competed in the Greco-Roman middleweight event at the 1920 Summer Olympics.

References

External links
 

1898 births
1959 deaths
Olympic wrestlers of the United States
Wrestlers at the 1920 Summer Olympics
American male sport wrestlers
Sportspeople from Chicago